The Women's Tournament of Champions 2016 is the women's edition of the 2016 Tournament of Champions, which is a PSA World Series event (Prize money : 150 000 $). The event took place at the Grand Central Terminal in New York City in the United States from 9 January to 14 January. Nour El Sherbini won her first Tournament of Champions trophy, beating Amanda Sobhy in the final.

Prize money and ranking points
For 2016, the prize purse was $150,000. The prize money and points breakdown is as follows:

Seeds

Draw and results

See also
2016 PSA World Tour
Men's Tournament of Champions 2016
Tournament of Champions (squash)

References

External links
PSA Women's Tournament of Champions 2016 website
Tournament of Champions 2016 official website

Women's Tournament of Champions
Women's Tournament of Champions
2016 in sports in New York (state)
2016 in women's squash
Tournament of Champions (squash)